The Australian Institute of Superannuation Trustees (AIST) is a national not-for-profit organisation and is the principal advocate and peak representative body for the $1.2 trillion profit-to-member superannuation sector. AIST plays a key role in policy development and is a leading provider of research.

AIST provides professional training, consulting services and support for trustees and fund staff to help them meet the challenges of managing superannuation funds and advancing the interests of their fund members. Each year, AIST hosts the Conference of Major Superannuation Funds (CMSF), in addition to numerous other industry conferences and events.

External links
Official website

Business organisations based in Australia
Professional associations based in Australia
Superannuation in Australia